Hall is an unincorporated community in Clark County, in the U.S. state of Washington.

History
A post office called Hall was established in 1906, and remained in operation until 1934. The community was named after James F. Hall, the original owner of the town site.

References

Unincorporated communities in Clark County, Washington
Unincorporated communities in Washington (state)